Radiolitidae is a family of rudists in the order Hippuritida.

Fossil record
These rudists lived between the Jurassic and the Cretaceous (age range: 130.0 to 66.043 million years ago).

Genera
Genera within this family include:

 † Agriopleura Kühn 1832
 † Apulites Tavani 1958
 † Archaeoradiolites Fenerci-Masse et al. 2006
 † Biradiolites d'Orbigny 1850
 † Bournonia Fischer 1887
 † Bystrickya Lupu 1976
 † Chiapasella Müllerried 1931
 † Colveraia Klinghardt 1921
 † Contraspira Mitchell 2009
 † Darendeella Karacabey-Oztemür 1976
 † Distefanella Parona 1901
 † Dubertretia Cox 1965
 † Durania Douvillé 1908
 † Eoradiolites Douvillé 1909
 †  Favus Laviano and Skelton 1992
 † Fossulites Astre 1957
 † Fundinia Sladić-Trifunović and Pejović 1977
 † Glabrobournonia Morris and Skelton 1995
 † Gorjanovicia Polšak 1967
 † Hacobjanella Atabekjan 1976
 † Horehronia Andrusov 1976
 † Jerinella Pejović 1988
 † Joufia Boehm 1897
 † Katzeria Slišković 1966
 † Kuehnia
 † Kurtinia Karacabey-Oztemuer 1980
 † Lapeirousella Milovanović 1938
 †  Lapeirousia Bayle 1878
 † Laskarevia Milovanović 1984
 † Macgillavryia Rojas et al. 1995
 † Maghrebites Pons 2012
 † Medeela
 † Medeella Parona 1924
 † Milovanovicia Polšak 1967
 † Monopilarites Philip and Platel 1998
 † Neoradiolites Milovanović 1935
 †  Orestia Lupu 1972
 † Osculigera Kühn 1933
 † Parabournonia Douvillé 1927
 † Paronaites Pons 2011
 † Paronella Wiontzek 1934
 † Petkovicia Kühn and Pejović 1959
 † Polsakia Slišković 1982
 † Potosites Pons et al. 2010
 † Praelapeirousia Wiontzek 1934
 † Praeradiolites Douvillé 1902
 † Pseudopolyconites Milovanović 1935
 † Pseudosabinia Morris and Skelton 1995
 † Radiolitella Douvillé 1904
 † Radiolites Lamarck 1801
 † Rajka
 † Robertella Cossmann 1903
 † Rosellia Pons 1977
 † Sauvagesia Bayle 1886
 † Sphaerulites Lamarck 1819
 † Tampsia Stephenson 1922
 † Tekirdagia Ozdikmen 2010
 † Thyrastylon Chubb 1956
 † Vautrinia Milovanović 1938

Gallery

References

External links

 
Molluscs described in 1848
Taxa named by John Edward Gray
Prehistoric bivalve families